Mirków may refer to the following places in Poland:
Mirków, Lower Silesian Voivodeship (south-west Poland)
Mirków, Łódź Voivodeship (central Poland)